Timeline of the COVID-19 pandemic in the Philippines may refer to:

 Timeline of the COVID-19 pandemic in the Philippines (2020)
 Timeline of the COVID-19 pandemic in the Philippines (2021)
 Timeline of the COVID-19 pandemic in the Philippines (2022)

Philippines